Anniversary Waltz may refer to:

Anniversary Waltz (play), a 1954 play directed by Moss Hart 
Anniversary Waltz (The Colbys), a 1986 episode of the television series The Colbys
"The Anniversary Waltz", a popular song published in 1941
"The Anniversary Waltz" (Status Quo song), two medley singles released in 1990 by the rock band Status Quo
"Waves of the Danube", also known as the "The Anniversary Song" or "The Anniversary Waltz"